The Garden of Death (also known by its French title), Op. 41, is a three-movement suite for solo piano written in 1918 (Movement I) and revised in 1919 (the addition of Movements II–III) by Finnish composer Leevi Madetoja. The suite, somber and mournful in character, is a tribute to the composer's brother, Yrjö, who as a captive during the Finnish Civil War was executed by the Red Guards. The Finnish pianist  premiered the suite in Helsinki, Finland, on 19 March 1923, with Madetoja in attendance.

History

Composition
In late January 1918, the embers of the First World War ignited into civil war between socialist Reds and the nationalist Whites. A few months later, the war brought personal tragedy to Madetoja: on 9 April, Red Guards captured and executed Yrjö Madetoja, Leevi's brother, during the Battle of Antrea in Kavantsaari. It fell to Leevi to inform his mother:

Around this time, Madetoja also published in  magazine a short piece for solo piano, originally titled Improvisation in Memory of my Brother Yrjö. In 1919, Madetoja expanded the piece into a three-movement suite, renaming it The Garden of Death and removing the reference to his brother. Notably, the suite shares melodic motifs with the Symphony No. 2 (Op. 35, 1918), which too finds its "deeply scarred" composer reflecting upon national tragedy and personal loss.

The Danish publishing house Edition Wilhelm Hansen published The Garden of Death in 1921. A year later in autumn, the German music magazine  (No. 35) published a glowing review of the score. "No truly musical person will regret making the acquaintance of this fine piano poem", the anonymous critic wrote. "These short piano pieces provide new, powerful testimony of this Finnish composer's emotional sensitivity and originality. A true poet speaks to us ... in a clear and personal language..." As such, the review continued, Madetoja had no need to "dabble in hyper-modern forms of expression" that composers utilize when they need to compensate for "an inner emptiness".

Premiere and other early performances 
Despite having been published in 1921, The Garden of Death waited two years for its premiere. This occurred on 19 March 1923, when the Finnish pianist  played Madetoja's suite during a public recital at University Hall in Helsinki. It was the "domestic novelty" on a program that also included: Ferruccio Busoni's transcription (1893) of the Chaconne from Bach's Partita for Violin No. 2, Beethoven's Piano Sonata No. 32 (1822), César Franck's Prélude, Choral et Fugue (1884), two small piano pieces from Sibelius's (1909), the first (D-flat major) of Liszt's Two Concert Études (1863), and Carl Tausig's transcription (1869) of the first of Schubert's Three Marches Militaires. At the conclusion of the performance, Madetoja—who was in attendance—received a "well-deserved" applause from the audience, which—though large—failed to fill the ballroom due a scheduling conflict with the Finnish premiere of Sibelius's ballet-pantomime Scaramouche. 

The critics reviewed Madetoja's suite positively. In addition, the critics praised Rängman-Björlin, variously characterizing her playing of Madetoja's suite for its "delicate execution" and "visionary finesse". A few months later in May, Rängman-Björlin scored a success for Madetoja by performing The Garden of Death in Berlin and Dresden. It made a positive impression on the German critics. Emphasizing Rängman-Björlin's Finnish heritage,  wrote that Madetoja's "very attractive" suite had sprouted from "the national soil"; similarly,  described The Garden of Death as "finely colored and impressive music", the "strange, folk-like tone" of which had "charmed with its wonderfully barren sweetness".  argued that with Madetoja's piece Rängman-Björlin had "achieved her greatest victory" of the evening.  

Near the turn of the decade, Madetoja's The Garden of Death also obtained the valuable advocacy of the Finnish pianist , who played the suite to acclaim in both Paris and Berlin in 1929. In 1948, Madetoja's former student,  arranged The Garden of Death for orchestra. This arrangement, the manuscript of which Edition Wilhelm Hansen published in 2012, is scored for: 2 flutes (1 doubling piccolo), 2 oboes (1 doubling cor anglais), 2 clarinets (in A), 2 bassoons, 4 horns (in F), 3 trumpets (in F), timpani, harp, and strings. As of 2022, no commercial recording of the orchestrated version of The Garden of Death has been made.

Structure
The Garden of Death, which lasts about 14 minutes, is in three movements. They are as follows:

The first movement, in common time, begins in E major. The second movement, in triple time, is a "haunting waltz" that beings in A major. The third movement, in cut time, is a "meditative lullaby" that begins in G-flat major.

Reception
The Finnish pianist Mika Rännäli, who recorded The Garden of Death in 2004, describes the piece as "one of the best and most poignant works [of the] Finnish piano literature": because "all encounter death", the suite's  exploration of "the innermost recesses of the mind and the depths of the soul has a universal impact".

Recordings
The sortable table below lists commercially available recordings of the Pastoral Suite:

Notes, references, and sources

Liner notes
 
 
 

Newspaper articles (by date)

Compositions by Leevi Madetoja
20th-century classical music
1919 compositions
Compositions for solo piano